A Bongard problem is a kind of puzzle invented by the Russian computer scientist Mikhail Moiseevich Bongard (Михаил Моисеевич Бонгард, 1924–1971), probably in the mid-1960s. They were published in his 1967 book on pattern recognition. The objective is to spot the differences between the two sides. Bongard, in the introduction of the book (which deals with a number of topics including perceptrons) credits the ideas in it to a group including M. N. Vaintsvaig, V. V. Maksimov, and M. S. Smirnov.

Overview
The idea of a Bongard problem is to present two sets of relatively simple diagrams, say A and B. All the diagrams from set A have a common factor or attribute, which is lacking in all the diagrams of set B. The problem is to find, or to formulate, convincingly, the common factor. The problems were popularised by their occurrence in the 1979 book Gödel, Escher, Bach by Douglas Hofstadter, himself a composer of Bongard problems. According to Hofstadter, "the skill of solving Bongard  problems lies very close to the core of 'pure' intelligence, if there is such a thing". Bongard problems are also at the heart of the game Zendo.

Scientific works on Bongard problems

 Bongard, M. M. (1970). Pattern Recognition. Rochelle Park, N.J.: Hayden Book Co., Spartan Books.  (Original publication: Проблема Узнавания, Nauka Press, Moscow, 1967)
 Maksimov, V. V. (1975). Система, обучающаяся классификации геометрических изображений (A system capable of learning to classify geometric images; as translated from the Russian by Marina Eskina), in Моделирование Обучения и Поведения (Modeling of Learning and Behavior, in Russian), M.S. Smirnov, V.V. Maksimov (eds.), Nauka, Moskva.
 Hofstadter, D. R. (1979). Gödel, Escher, Bach: an Eternal Golden Braid. New York: Basic Books.
 Montalvo, F. S. (1985). Diagram Understanding: the Intersection of Computer Vision and Graphics. M.I.T. Artificial Intelligence Laboratory, A. I. Memo 873, November 1985.
 Saito, K., and Nakano, R. (1993) A Concept Learning Algorithm with Adaptive Search. Proceedings of Machine Intelligence 14 Workshop. Oxford University Press. See pp. 347–363.
 Hofstadter, D. R. and the Fluid Analogies Research Group (1995). Fluid Concepts and Creative Analogies: Computer Models of the Fundamental Mechanisms of Thought. New York: Basic Books.
 Hofstadter, D. R. (1995). On Seeing A’s and Seeing As. Stanford Humanities Review 4/2 pp. 109–121.
 Hofstadter, D. R. (1997). Le Ton beau de Marot. New York: Basic Books.
 Linhares, A. (2000). A glimpse at the metaphysics of Bongard problems. Artificial Intelligence, Volume 121, Issue 1-2, pp. 251–270.
 Foundalis, H. (2006). Phaeaco: A Cognitive Architecture Inspired by Bongard’s Problems. Doctoral dissertation, Indiana University, Center for Research on Concepts and Cognition (CRCC), Bloomington, Indiana. Foundalis left the field in 2008 due to ethical concerns regarding machines that can pass as human, and restarted in 2011 having considered that human suicide bombers are already here anyway.
 Anastasiade, J., and Szalwinski, C. (2010). Building Computer-Based Tutors to Help Learners Solve Ill-Structured Problems. In Proceedings of the World Conference on Educational Multimedia, Hypermedia and Telecommunications 2010. Toronto, Ontario, Canada: Association for the Advancement of Computing in Education. pp. 3726–3732.
 Nie, W. and NVIDIA Research (2020). Bongard-LOGO: A New Benchmark for Human-Level Concept Learning and Reasoning. Advances in Neural Information Processing Systems, Volume 33, pp. 16468-16480.
 Jiang, H., Ma, X. and NVIDIA Research (2022). Bongard-HOI: Benchmarking Few-Shot Visual Reasoning for Human-Object Interactions. Proceedings of the IEEE/CVF Conference on Computer Vision and Pattern Recognition (CVPR), 2022.

References

External links

The On-Line Encyclopedia of Bongard Problems
Index of Bongard problems

Puzzles
Cognitive science
Cognitive psychology
Computer-related introductions in 1967